Sameh Maraaba (born 19 March 1992) is a Palestinian association footballer who currently plays for Jabal Al-Mukaber as a forward in the West Bank Premier League, and for the Palestine national team.

Career
Maraaba made his professional international debut for Palestine in 2015 during Second round World Cup qualifying for the 2018 FIFA World Cup against Saudi Arabia. The very next game, against Malaysia he scored twice, in Palestine's 6-0 surprise routing.

International goals
Scores and results list Palestine's goal tally first.

Personal life
Maraaba would have made his debut for Palestine a lot sooner, however he was embroiled within the political turmoil that surrounds Palestine as a nation. Maraaba was arrested by the Israeli Defence Force on 28 April 2014 at the border crossing between Jordan and the West Bank as he returned from a training camp in Qatar. A spokesman for the Israeli Ministry of Foreign Affairs claimed they had "concrete information that he was carrying, or was involved in the potential transfer of communication equipment and finance on behalf of Hamas". Maraaba denied the claims, with the Palestinian Football Association claiming that he had been "carrying money back to his football club which had been given to him by an ex-colleague of the club who had previously been jailed by Israel as a member of Hamas". As a result, Maraaba was detained for a period of 7 months, resulting in him missing Palestine's 2014 AFC Challenge Cup campaign (in which Palestine would ultimately win, qualifying for the 2015 AFC Asian Cup in the process), the 2014 Asian Games (in which Palestine made the Round of 16), and the 2015 AFC Asian Cup in Australia.

References

External links
 
 Sameh Maraaba at Eurosport

1992 births
Living people
Palestinian footballers
Palestine international footballers
Jabal Al-Mukaber Club players
Thaqafi Tulkarem players
Association football forwards
Footballers at the 2018 Asian Games
2019 AFC Asian Cup players
Asian Games competitors for Palestine
West Bank Premier League players
Palestine Technical University alumni
Palestine youth international footballers